The 1st Armored Division, nicknamed "Old Ironsides," is a combined arms division of the United States Army. The division is part of III Armored Corps and operates out of Fort Bliss in El Paso, Texas. It was the first armored division of the United States' Army to see battle in World War II. Since World War II, the division has been involved in the Korean War, Cuban Missile Crisis, Persian Gulf War, Iraq, Afghanistan, and several other operations. The division has also received numerous awards and recognition.

Insignia

The division was nicknamed "Old Ironsides" by its first commander, Major General Bruce Magruder, after he saw a picture of the frigate , also nicknamed "Old Ironsides". The large "1" at the top represents the numerical designation of the division and the insignia is used as a basis for most of the other sub-unit insignias.

In January 1918, the Tank Corps of the United States Army was established under Colonel Samuel Rockenbach. At his direction, First Lieutenant J. P. Wharton designed the original coat of arms: a triangle on a shield surrounded by a wreath and a silver dragon. The triangle itself is an old heraldic element of armorial design known as a pile, representing the head of a spear. There was no shoulder patch in 1918.

The 7th Cavalry Brigade (mechanized) contributed the other part of the present-day Armor shoulder patch. The brigade formed out of the 1st Cavalry Regiment in Marfa Texas, on 16 January 1933 under General Daniel Van Voorhis, then Colonel of the Cavalry. The 7th Cavalry Brigade included the 13th Cavalry and had been organized specifically to develop the new armored force concept while training in the emerging modern war-fighting tactics.

Colonel George F. Linthwaite (then a newly enlisted Private) joined the 13th Cavalry regiment in 1933. Major General Robert W. Grow (then a Major and brigade adjutant) was instructed to develop a shoulder patch for the new armored force. Grow announced to the brigade that a contest would be held to design the new Armored force patch. A three-day weekend pass was awarded to the designer of the winning entry.

Linthwaite won the contest: he designed a circular patch, four inches in diameters, with a solid yellow-gold background to symbolize the Cavalry heritage. On the face of the patch, he drew a stylized black tank track with a drive and idler sprockets to symbolize mobility. In the center of the track at a slight diagonal, he placed a single cannon barrel, also in black, to symbolize firepower. Finally, to symbolize the striking power of the new armored force, he added a diagonal lightning bolt in red, extending across the total design and full diameter of the patch.

In 1940, Major General Adna R. Chaffee Jr. was promoted to lead the newly created Armor Forces which had evolved from the old 7th Cavalry Brigade and were preparing for the looming war in Europe. Chaffee wanted a patch for this new Armored Force. He chose to combine the 7th Brigade patch with the triangle from the World War I crest. The tri-colors, with blue for infantry, red for artillery, and yellow for cavalry – represented the three basic components of the mechanized armed force.  In 1940 the War Department officially designated the now-familiar patch worn by soldiers of all United States Army Armored Divisions.

History

World War II 
On 15 July 1940, the 1st Armored Division, largely an expanded and reorganized version of the 7th Cavalry Brigade, was activated at Fort Knox under the command of Major General Bruce Magruder.  The 1st Cavalry Regiment was re-designated as the 1st Armored Regiment and the 13th Cavalry Regiment was re-designated as the 13th Armored Regiment under the 1st Armored Brigade, 1st Armored Division. For more than two years after its activation, the 1st Armored Division trained at Fort Knox and the division pioneered and developed tank gunnery and strategic armored offensives while increasing from 66 medium-sized tanks to over 600 medium and light armored vehicles.

Training 

On 15 July 1940 the division was trained at Fort Knox, Kentucky. The U.S. Army had never carried out this before and the troops necessary for this kind of force were drawn from a variety of army posts.

When the organization was completed, the division had tanks, artillery, and infantry. In direct support were tank destroyer, maintenance, medical, supply and engineer battalions, but bringing the division up to its full quota of equipment and vehicles was difficult. Although new equipment was received almost daily, the division had only nine outdated medium tanks primarily armed with  guns until March 1941. 
Most of the division attended the Armored Force School at Knox to train in using their newly acquired tanks, half-tracks, and guns.

The division left in September 1941 for three months to participate in maneuvers in Louisiana. The division returned to Fort Knox the day before the Japanese attack on Pearl Harbor. Training took on a new intensity. The division was reorganized, and all tanks, both medium and light were put into two armored regiments, the 1st and 13th. A third armored field artillery battalion, the 91st, was formed, and the 701st Tank Destroyer Battalion was organized and attached to the division.

At Fort Knox, the division participated in the Technicolor short movie The Tanks Are Coming (as the "First Armored Force"). It deployed to participate in the VII Corps Maneuvers on 18 August 1941. Once the maneuvers concluded, the 1st Armored Division then moved on 28 August 1941 and arrived at Camp Polk for the Second Army Louisiana Maneuvers on 1 September 1941. They then moved to Fort Jackson on 30 October 1941 to participate in the First Army Carolina Maneuvers. The division returned to Fort Knox on 7 December 1941 but started to prepare for deployment overseas instead of returning to garrison.

The 1st Armored Division was ordered to Fort Dix on 11 April 1942 to await their deployment overseas. They arrived in Northern Ireland on 16 May 1942 and trained on the moors until they moved on to England on 29 October 1942. The division was now commanded by Major General Orlando Ward.

Combat operations 

A volunteer troop of three M3 Grant crews from the 1st Armored Division commanded by Henry Cabot Lodge Jr. fought in the Battle of Gazala under British command in June 1942, becoming the first Americans to engage the Germans on land in the war (* Major Lodge was not in one of the three tanks which actually fought).

Alerted for the invasion were the 1st Battalion of the 1st Armored Regiment, the 1st and 2nd Battalions of the 13th Armored Regiment, nearly all the 6th Armored Infantry Regiment, the 27th Armored Field Artillery Battalion, "B" and "C" Companies of the 701st Tank Destroyer Battalion, and detachments of the 16th Armored Engineer Battalion, the Supply Battalion, the Maintenance Battalion, 47th Armored Medical Battalion, and the 141st Signal Company.

The unit's proper first contact with an enemy was as part of the Allied invasion of Northwest Africa, Operation Torch, on 8 November 1942. Elements of the division became part of the Northern Task Force and became the first American armored division to see combat in World War II. Combat Command B (CCB) of the division landed east and west of Oran under the command of Brigadier General Lunsford E. Oliver and entered the city on 10 November 1942. On 24 November 1942, CCB moved from Tafraoui, Algeria to Bedja, Tunisia, and raided the Djedeida airfield the next day and conquered the city on 28 November 1942. CCB moved southwest of Tebourba on 1 December 1942, engaged with German forces on El Guessa Heights on 3 December 1942, but its lines were pierced on 6 December 1942. CCB withdrew to Bedja with heavy equipment losses between 10 and 11 December 1942 and was placed in reserve. CCB next attacked in the Ousseltia Valley on 21 January 1943, and cleared that area until 29 January 1943 when sent to Bou Chebka, and arrived at Maktar on 14 February 1943.

Combat Command A (CCA) fought at Faïd Pass commencing on 30 January 1943, and advanced to Sidi Bou Zid, where it was pushed back with heavy tank losses on 14 February 1943, and had elements isolated on Djebel Lessouda, Djebel Kasaira, and Garet Hadid. Combat Command C (CCC), which was formed on 23 January 1943 to raid Sened Station on 24 January, advanced towards Sbeita and counterattacked to support CCA in the Sidi Bou Zid area on 15 February 1943, but was forced to retreat with heavy losses. The division withdrew from Sbeita on 16 February 1943, but by 21 February 1943 CCB contained the German attack toward Tébessa. The German withdrawal allowed the division to recover Kasserine Pass on 26 February 1943 and assemble in reserve. The division moved northeast of Gafsa on 13 March 1943 and attacked in heavy rains on 17 March 1943 as CCA took Zannouch, but became immobilized by rain the next day. The division drove on Maknassy on 20 March 1943, and fought the Battle of Djebel Naemia on 22–25 March 1943, and then fought to break through positions barring the road to Gabès between 29 March and 1 April 1943. It followed up on the withdrawing German forces on 6 April 1943 and attacked towards Mateur with CCA on 27 April 1943, which fell after fighting on Hill 315 and Hill 299 on 3 May 1943. The division, now commanded by Major General Ernest N. Harmon, fought the Battle for Djebel Achtel between 5 and 11 May 1943 and entered Ferryville on 7 May 1943. 
With the British forces taking Tunis and Americans in Bizerte, the Axis forces in Tunisia surrendered between 9 and 13 May 1943. The division was reorganized in French Morocco and began arriving in Naples, Italy on 28 October 1943.

After the Allied invasion of Sicily, the 1st Armored Division, which was part of the American Fifth Army, invaded mainland Italy. It participated in the attack on the Winter Line in November 1943, flanked the Axis armies in the landings at Anzio, and passed through the city of Rome and pursued the retreating enemy northward until mid-July 1944. At that point, Harmon was replaced by Major General Vernon Prichard, who led the 1st AD for the rest of the war. Three days after Prichard took command, the division was reorganized based on experiences in the North Africa Campaign. The change was drastic: it eliminated the armored and infantry regiments in favor of three separate tank and infantry battalions, disbanded the Supply Battalion, and cut the strength of the division from 14,000 to 10,000. The result of the reorganization was a more flexible and balanced division, with roughly equivalent infantry and tank battalions. These forces could be combined or custom-tailored by the command to meet any situation. The additional infantry strength would prove particularly useful in future campaigns in the largely mountainous combat of the Italian campaign. The division continued in combat to the Po Valley until the German forces in Italy surrendered on 2 May 1945. In June, the division moved to Germany as part of the occupation forces.

Casualties 

Total battle casualties:7,096
Killed in action: 1,194
Wounded in action: 5,168
Missing in action: 216
Prisoner of war: 518

During the war, the Old Ironsides division captured 41 towns and cities and 108,740 prisoners.  722 division soldiers were awarded the Silver Star and another 908 received the Bronze Star.  The division received 5,478 Purple Hearts. Two division soldiers were awarded the Medal of Honor during World War II: Private Nicholas Minue and Second Lieutenant Thomas Weldon Fowler.

The 1st Armored Division flag returned to the New York Port of Embarkation on 24 April 1946 and was deactivated at Camp Kilmer, New Jersey on 25 April 1946. The component headquarters and units which remained in Germany were retasked and renamed as a component of the United States Constabulary.

After World War II 

As part of the Korean War buildup of American forces, the 1st Armored Division was reactivated at Fort Hood, Texas on 7 March 1951. The division became one of the first divisions in the Army to integrate black soldiers throughout the ranks, and was also the only combat-ready armored division in the continental United States and the first to receive the M48 Patton tank.
Training for nuclear war became a major theme in the mid-1950s.  The 1st Armored Division participated in tests of the "Atomic Field Army" at Fort Hood and in Operation Sagebrush, the largest joint maneuver conducted since World War II.  The 1st Armored Division moved to its new base of operations at Fork Polk, Louisiana after completing the exercise in February 1956.

Cuba 

At the end of the 1950s, the Army's focus on a nuclear battlefield waned and it experienced years of reduced budgets.  The 1st Armored Division reverted into a training cadre for new inductees after being reduced in size and moved back to Fort Hood.

In 1962, the 1st Armored Division was brought back to full strength and reorganized.  Brigades replaced combat commands and the division's aviation assets doubled. Intense training followed the reorganization.  In October 1962 the 1st Armored Division was declared combat-ready just before the Cuban Missile Crisis. The division deployed from Fort Hood, Texas to Fort Stewart in response to the Soviet stationing of missiles in Cuba.  The entire operation took 18 days.

In the following six weeks, the 1st Armored Division conducted live-fire training and amphibious exercises on the Georgia and Florida coasts. One highlight was a visit from President John F. Kennedy on 26 November 1962. Shortly thereafter, tensions eased and the division returned to Ft. Hood.

Vietnam 
Although the 1st Armored Division did not participate as a division in the Vietnam War, there were two units, Company A, 501st Aviation and 1st Squadron, 1st Cavalry, that served in Vietnam.  Both earned Presidential Unit Citations, and 1-1 Cavalry received two Valorous Unit Awards and three Vietnamese Crosses of Gallantry.  Neither unit was officially detached from the 1st Armored Division thus veterans of both units may wear the division's patch as a combat patch. In 1967 the 198th Infantry Brigade was formed from three of the division's infantry battalions and deployed from Fort Hood to Vietnam.  After the war, two of the three battalions, 1-6 Infantry and 1-52 Infantry, returned to the 1st Armored Division.

In early April 1968, when rioting broke out in many American cities following the assassination of Martin Luther King Jr., the 3rd Brigade was deployed on 6 April to assist in restoring order during rioting in Chicago.

West Germany 

In the early 1970s, American forces withdrew from Vietnam and the Army was heavily restructured: the 1st Armored Division was rumored to be on the list of units to be deactivated. Veterans of the division organized a letter-writing campaign to "save" the 1st Armored Division.

As part of the Army's post-Vietnam reorganization, the 1st Armored Division was moved to West Germany in 1971 and replaced the 4th Armored Division in the Bavarian city of Ansbach. The Division headquarters remained in Ansbach, with brigade units in the neighboring towns of Bamberg, Illesheim, Fürth (Nuremberg), Schwabach, Katterbach, Crailsheim, Erlangen and Zirndorf for the next twenty years, as part of VII Corps, itself part of NATO's Central Army Group.

1st Battalion, 51st Infantry (Mech), at Crailsheim, part of the 1st Brigade, was deactivated on 16 June 1984 as a result of the division's conversion to the Division 86 force structure. Under the Division 86 structure, each heavy division decreased by one infantry battalion, while remaining infantry battalions gained one additional rifle company.

On 16 April 1986, the Aviation Brigade, 1st Armored Division, was activated in Germany.

In April 1987, 6th Battalion, 43rd Air Defense Artillery (Patriot) moved to a newly built Urlas Kaserne (located near Bismarck & Katterbach Kaserne) assigned to the 1st Armored Division.

On 16 November 1987, the 501st Combat Aviation Battalion was deactivated and re-flagged as 2nd Battalion, 1st Aviation Regiment at Katterbach Kaserne, Federal Republic of Germany, under the 1st Armored Division.

Persian Gulf War 

In August 1990, Iraq invaded Kuwait.  On 8 November 1990, the 1st Armored Division was alerted for deployment to the Middle East to provide an offensive option should Saddam refuse to withdraw from Kuwait. This alert changed the division's focus, from "building down" in Europe to "building up" in Southwest Asia.

Division leaders and soldiers began focusing on planning, training and unit deployment. Planning focused on the challenge of logistics, as the division had to be shipped to Saudi Arabia in a logical order to support the buildup for combat operations.

Commanders and their staff rapidly integrated new equipment into their units to be deployed to the Persian Gulf region.  The division also prepared to receive new units: 3rd Brigade, 3rd Infantry Division replaced 1st Brigade, 1st Armored Division. Round-out units such as the 312th Support Center (RAOC) composed of reservists from throughout Germany, also joined the division. Other units, such as the 54th and 19th Engineer battalions, the 218th Military Police Company, and the 7th Support Group, joined the 1st Armored Division in Kuwait.

Units concentrated on preparing vehicles for overseas movement while undergoing individual and unit training, including gunnery, in the few weeks available before deployment. The division qualified 355 tanks and 300 Bradley crews on Tables VII and VIII, conducted division artillery howitzer section gunnery, fired modified Vulcan Table VIII and qualified Stinger and Chaparral crews. Battle drill rehearsals and wargaming seminars were also part of the rigorous training agenda.

The division transported equipment by rail, wheeled convoy, and rotary-wing self-deployment. These movements unavoidably occurred on short notice or in bad weather, and posed challenges to coordination and logistics. The first trains departed for port the last week of November 1990 and continued to so until the second week of December 1990. Within two months 17,400 soldiers and 7,050 pieces of equipment were moved to Saudi Arabia for Operation Desert Shield/Storm.

Battle damage assessment 
 25 Feb: 2 tanks, 25 APC, 9 artillery, 14 ADA, 48 trucks, 314 EPW
 26 Feb: 112 tanks, 82 APC, 2 artillery, 2 ADA, 94 trucks, 545 EPW
 27 Feb: 186 tanks, 127 APC, 66 artillery, 5 ADA, 118 trucks, 839 EPW
 28 Feb: 41 tanks, 60 APC, 15 artillery, 11 ADA, 244 trucks, 281 EPW
 1–12 Mar: 99 tanks, 191 APC, 98 artillery, 105 ADA, 879 trucks, 4,707 EPW
 Total: 440 tanks, 485 APC, 190 artillery, 137 ADA, 1,383 trucks, 6,686 EPW

Four division soldiers were killed in action and 52 wounded in action during the Gulf War

The Balkans 

On 18 December 1995, under the command of Major General William L. Nash, the division deployed to northeastern Bosnia as the command and major troop contributing element of Task Force Eagle, a peace enforcement, multinational unit. The 1st Armored Division returned in late 1996 to Germany.

In 1999, the unit deployed to Kosovo for Operation Allied Force and Operation Joint Guardian. The unit trained heavily afterwards in the Hohenfels and Grafenwöhr Training Areas in Germany, with realistic OPFOR (Opposition Forces) exercises.

In 2000, the 1st Armored Division's 1st Brigade Combat Team trained at the Grafenwoehr Training Area (GTA). In February 2000, 1st Armored Division Headquarters announced the closure of military facilities in Bad Kreuznach and its subsequent move to Wiesbaden scheduled for June 2001. The 1st Armored Division trained at HTA and GTA in three separate exercises in March 2001. Ready First participated in Mountain Guardian III at Hohenfels as a mission rehearsal exercise for Kosovo.

The 1st Armored Division's command and control elements conducted a warfighter exercise in the GTA between 21 March and 17 April 2001. The 1st Armored Division took command of Task Force Falcon in Kosovo as Brigadier General Randal Tieszen accepted the colors from 1st Infantry Division's Brigadier General Ricardo Sanchez. The 1st Armored Division celebrated its 60th birthday at home and abroad in Kosovo on 15 July 2001. Major General George W. Casey, Jr. traveled to Boston Harbor in August 2001, where he connected with Commander Bill Foster of the historic warship .

Iraq 

In the months building up to the March 2003 invasion of Iraq, two battalions of the 1st Armored Division's 3rd Brigade were deployed to support Operation Iraqi Freedom. The 2–70 Armor and 1–41 Infantry battalion task forces augmented the 82nd Airborne Division, the 3rd Infantry Division, and the 101st Airborne Division throughout the campaign to oust Iraqi dictator Saddam Hussein. These units spearheaded the U.S. assaults in As Samawah and Karbala and later occupied the southern area of Baghdad. The 1st Battalion, 13th Armor followed shortly behind towards the end of March 2003.

In May 2003, the division deployed to Iraq and assumed responsibility for Baghdad, under command of Major General Ricardo Sanchez, relieving the 3d Infantry Division. The 1st Brigade, under Colonel Michael Tucker and after July 2003 under Colonel Peter Mansoor, assumed responsibility for the Rusafa and Adhamiya districts of central Baghdad. The division was scheduled to return to Germany in April 2004 but was extended in country an additional 3 months in order to oppose an uprising of Shia militia led by Moqtada Al Sadr. During the extension Task Force 1–37 Armor ("Bandits") fought Sadr's forces in Karbala while Task Force 2–37 AR ("Dukes") along with elements of 2–3 FA ("Gunners") fought in Diwaniya, Sadr City, Al-Kut, and Najaf. Task Force 1–36 IN ("Spartans") became the Combined Joint Task Force 7 Operational Reserve and conducted operations along Route Irish from Baghdad International Airport to the Green Zone in support of the 1st Cavalry Division. Forces from the 2d Brigade fought in Kut. During its 15-month deployment, the division lost 133 soldiers.

Ready First 
The division's 1st Brigade deployed again to Iraq in January 2006 under the command of Colonel Sean B. MacFarland after months of intensive training in Grafenwöhr and Hohenfels, Germany. Many of the soldiers who fought with units like 1–36 Infantry ("Spartans"), 2–37 Armor ("Iron Dukes"), and 1–37 ("Bandits") during the invasion of Iraq returned for a second tour. Most of the 1st BCT was initially deployed to Northern Iraq in Nineveh province concentrating on the city of Tal' Afar. In May 2006, the main force of the 1st Brigade received orders to move south to the city of Ramadi in volatile Al Anbar Province.

Since 2003, Al Anbar served as a base of operations for the Sunni insurgency and al Qaeda.  Ramadi, its capital, had neither a government nor a police force when the brigade arrived.  Most military strategists inside and outside of the Bush administration believed that the war in Anbar had already concluded unsuccessfully.  Al Qaeda in Iraq publicly announced Ramadi as the capital of their new caliphate and the city alone averaged more than twenty attacks per day; the province was statistically the most dangerous location in the country, and the insurgency enjoyed free rein throughout much of the province.

Ramadi 
When the 1st Brigade arrived in Ramadi in June 2006 with more than 70 M1 Abrams tanks and 84 Bradley fighting vehicles, many locals believed the brigade was preparing for a Fallujah-style block-by-block clearing assault on the city and many insurgents fled the city.  Following Colonel H.R. McMaster's "Clear, Hold, Build" strategy, the brigade developed a plan to isolate the insurgents, deny them sanctuary, and build Iraqi security forces.

The 1st Brigade moved into some of Ramadi's dangerous neighborhoods and built four of what would eventually become eighteen combat outposts starting in July 2006. The soldiers brought the territory under control and inflicted many casualties on the insurgents. On 24 July, the Al-Qaeda in Iraq (AQI) launched a counterattack, initiating 24 assaults, each with about 100 fighters, on American positions. The insurgents failed in all of their attacks and lost about 30 men.

Independence Day 
Simultaneous with combat operations, the brigade worked on the "hold" portion of clear, hold, build. Lieutenant Colonel Tony Deane, commander of Task Force 1-35 Armor, approached Sheik Abdul Sattar Bezia al-Rishawi of the Abu Risha tribe in an attempt to recruit his tribesmen to the police force.

In his book A Chance in Hell that focuses on the operation in Al Anbar, Jim Michaels wrote that the US had a flawed view on civil government which ignored the tribal history of Iraq. "The tribal system embraced elements of democracy. The sheik may not be elected," wrote Michaels," but nor is he born into his job.  Sheiks are generally selected by a group of elders[...] Throughout history, ignoring the tribes [in Iraq] has never been a smart move.  Sheiks have wielded power for thousands of years and survived countless efforts to blunt their influence in the name of modernity."

To facilitate Sheik Sittar, Colonel MacFarland's deputy, Lieutenant Colonel Jim Lechner, and his police implementation officer, Marine Major Teddy Gates, changed the location for Iraqi Police recruiting. They wanted a more secure location close to Sattar's house, as this would enable them to build a police station north of the Euphrates River in an area where many potential recruits lived. 
Having already had his father and three brothers killed by AQI, Sattar appreciated the idea. The residents' response was overwhelming by standing in line to serve as IP's at the next recruiting drive.

In August, the new Jazeera police station north of the river, manned mostly by Abu Ali Jassim tribe members, was attacked and the sheikh of the tribe was killed. AQI hid the sheikh's body so it was not found for several days, a violation of Islam's strict burial rules that call for interment within 24 hours.

The attack on the station killed several Iraqi police and created many burn casualties. MacFarland offered to evacuate the police to Camp Blue Diamond, an American Army camp outside of Ramadi, while they repaired the station. But the Iraqis refused to abandon their post and instead put their flag back up and resumed patrolling that same day.

Awakening 
With the locals outraged by AQI's disregard of Islamic funeral laws, the charismatic Sattar stepped forward to continue the push toward working with the Americans. On 9 September 2006, he organized a tribal council, attended by more than 50 sheiks as well as MacFarland, where he officially declared an "Anbar Awakening". It would convene an Awakening Council dedicated to driving the AQI out of Ramadi and establish rule of law and local governance.  The Anbar Awakening was realized with Sittar as its leader.  McFarland, speaking later about the meeting, said, "I told them that I now knew what it was like to be in Independence Hall on 4 July 1776 when the Declaration of Independence was signed." 
While attacks remained high through October 2006, the Awakening and Sittar's influence began to spread. The AQI, realized it was losing its influence over the citizens and launched a counterattack on the Sufia tribal area on 25 November.  The attack was intended to terrorize and insult the Sufia tribe, though with the 1st BCT's M1A1 tanks reinforcing tribal defenders, the AQI was repelled and the relationship between the Sufia tribe and the 1st Armored Division improved.

By early 2007, the combination of tribal engagement and combat outposts was defeating AQI's in Ramadi and throughout the province. President George W. Bush, in his 23 January 2007 State of the Union speech referred to Al Anbar as a place "where al Qaeda terrorists have gathered and local forces have begun showing a willingness to fight them."

"The Gettysburg of this war" 
By February 2007, contact with insurgents dropped almost 70 percent in number since June 2006 as well as decreasing in complexity and effect.  By the summer of 2007, fighting in Al Anbar was mostly over.  Frederick Kagan, resident scholar at the American Enterprise Institute, called Al Anbar "the Gettysburg of this war, to the extent that counterinsurgencies can have such turning points," writing "Progress in Anbar and throughout the Sunni community has depended heavily on a skillful balance between military force and political efforts at the local level."

The tactics, techniques, and procedures used by 1st BCT were groundbreaking at the time but came to serve as the philosophical basis for the surge in Iraq. In nine months, 85 soldiers, sailors, and Marines were killed, and over 500 were wounded.

Division Headquarters redeploys 
In September 2007, amid a national debate about troop levels in Iraq and, more broadly, about the US strategy in Iraq, the 1st Armored Division Headquarters was re-deployed to Iraq. General David Petraeus' surge strategy was in effect, with major counterinsurgency operations across the country. "This is a pivotal and historic time for the 1st AD, for the forces in Iraq and for the nation," said Brig. Gen. James C. Boozer, a deputy commanding general for 1st AD at the time of the division's deployment. The division began its deployment the same day Petraeus delivered his Report to Congress on the Situation in Iraq, concluding that "the military objectives of the surge are, in large measure, being met."

The division, commanded by then-Major General Mark Hertling, conducted a relief in place with the 25th Infantry Division and assumed command of Multi-National Division North, headquartered in Tikrit, Iraq, on 28 October 2007, just as MacFarland's Anbar Awakening was pushing AQI out of Anbar. At the time in northern Iraq, enemy attacks averaged 1,800 a month, the Iraqis had little trust in their central government, and the unemployment rate was high.

Hertling assumed responsibility for all Coalition forces in Northern Iraq.  Multi-National Division North was composed of five maneuver brigade combat teams, a combat aviation brigade, a fires brigade, and an engineer brigade. The division had responsibility includes the Iraqi provinces of Ninawa, Kirkuk (formerly at Tamin), Salah ad Din, and Diyala along with Dahuk, and As Sulaymaniyah. The area included the critical cities of Tal Afar, Mosul, Bayji, Tikrit, Kirkuk, Samarra, Balad, Baqubah, Dahuk, and Sulaymaniah.  Arbil province remained aligned as a separate Multi-National Division, North-East. The division area of operations included ethnic fault lines between Arabs and Kurds, religious fault lines between Sunni and Shia Muslims, numerous tribal regions, and the complexities involving significant former regime elements.

The 1st Armored Division immediately applied a mix of lethal and non-lethal counterinsurgency tactics, as maneuver battalions partnered with State Department officials and provincial reconstruction teams.  Commanders applied a focused lethality, protecting the Iraqi population while killing insurgents in large volumes.

The division transferred responsibility to Headquarters 25th Infantry Division on 8 December 2008 and returned to Wiesbaden Army Airfield (later renamed Lucius D. Clay Kaserne) in Germany.

On 17 April 2013, US Secretary of Defense Chuck Hagel announced the deployment of elements of the 1st Armored Division headquarters to Jordan in response to the crisis in Syria. The elements from the 1st Armored Division joined forces in Jordan and provided command and control in cooperation with Jordan forces, which was used to establish a joint task force headquarters that provided command and control for chemical weapons response, humanitarian assistance efforts, and stability operations. The 1st Armored Division planners in Jordan are facilitating the exchange of information with the Jordanian Armed Forces.

Move to Fort Bliss 
In 2005, the Base Realignment and Closure (BRAC) commission decided to move the 1st Armored Division to Fort Bliss, Texas no later than 2012. As part of the current Army-wide transformation, several division units were deactivated or converted to other units. The 1st Armored Division officially uncased its colors at Fort Bliss on 13 May 2011.

 1st Brigade: The 1st Brigade, 1st Armored Division cased its colors at Friedberg, Germany on 20 April 2007, ending 62 years of military presence in Germany. 1st Brigade reactivated and uncased its colors on 27 October 2008. and began reconfiguring as a Stryker brigade combat team (SBCT) after redeployment from Iraq in November 2010. Denoted 1-1AD "Ready First", the 1st BCT, 1st Armored Division deployed to Afghanistan in December 2012. The first female engagement team to deploy from Fort Bliss was trained in 2012 before Secretary of Defense Leon Panetta's order rescinding restrictions on women in combat roles. "Ready First" Brigade converted from a Stryker BCT to an ABCT 20 June 2019.
 2nd Brigade: 2nd Brigade, 1st Armored Division in Baumholder, Germany, remained assigned to USAREUR until 15 July 2009, when it was reflagged as the separate 170th Infantry Brigade. It relocated to the U.S. in 2012. As part of the Grow the Army Plan announced on 19 December 2007, the 170th is one of two infantry brigades to be activated and retained in Germany until 2012 and 2013. (The other brigade is the 172nd Infantry Brigade in Schweinfurt, Germany, which reflagged from 2nd Brigade, 1st Infantry Division on 16 March 2008.) In 2010, the U.S. Army attached the 2nd Brigade, 1st Armored Division to the Brigade Modernization Command, assigning it the evaluation mission previously held by the 5th Brigade, 1st Armored Division, AETF. In 2016, 2nd Brigade moved to the Ready pool for deployment.
 3rd Brigade: On 28 March 2008, the 3rd Brigade, 1st Armored Division (HBCT) deactivated at Fort Riley and reflagged as 2d (Dagger) Brigade, 1st Infantry Division (HBCT). The 3rd Brigade was reactivated as an infantry brigade combat team on 2 July 2009 at Fort Bliss.
 4th Brigade: On 4 March 2008, 4th Brigade, 1st Armored Division activated at Fort Bliss as a HBCT and reflagged from the 4th Brigade, 1st Cavalry Division.
 5th Brigade: In 2007, a new unit, 5th Brigade, 1st Armored Division, activated at Fort Bliss as an Army evaluation task force. 5th BCT tested the Future Force Warrior system. It evaluated multiple types of spin out equipment and prepared them for fielding to the rest of the Army. 5th Brigade was deactivated in 2010. 
 Aviation Brigade: The Aviation Brigade, 1st Armored Division deactivated on 7 June 2006 at Fliegerhorst Kaserne, Hanau, Germany and moved to Fort Riley, Kansas to reflag as the modular Combat Aviation Brigade, 1st Infantry Division. The Combat Aviation Brigade, 4th ID was reflagged to CAB, 1st Armored Division. 4–501st Aviation (4th Battalion "Pistoleros", 501st Regiment, Combat Aviation Brigade, 1st Armored Division) deployed to Kuwait in November 2012.
 Engineer Brigade: The Engineer Brigade, 1st Armored Division, the last of its kind in the Army, cased its colors and inactivated at Giessen, Germany on 26 April 2007.
 Division Artillery: Division Artillery, 1st Armored Division cased its colors and was deactivated at Baumholder, Germany on 1 May 2007. The 1st AD DIVARTY was the last standing division artillery unit in the Army. The DIVARTY reactivated in 2014 at Fort Bliss.

The division's colors were officially moved from Germany to Fort Bliss on 13 May 2011. On 25 June 2013, Army force restructuring plans were announced.  As part of the plan, the division deactivated its 3rd Brigade Combat Team following its 2014 deployment to Afghanistan.  The 4th BCT was reflagged as the 3rd Brigade Combat team in April 2015.

The 1st Armored Division's Sustainment Brigade deployed 200 of its soldiers to Afghanistan on 11 May 2015.

Operation Freedom's Sentinel 
In late December 2016, ArmyTimes reported that about 1,500 soldiers from the 1st Stryker Brigade Combat Team and about 800 soldiers from the 16th Combat Aviation Brigade to Afghanistan as part of Operation Freedom's Sentinel. In March 2017, Stars and Stripes reported that, according to an Army statement, 200 soldiers from the 1st Sustainment Brigade will deploy throughout Afghanistan to lead logistical operations, particularly providing supply, to support the US counter terrorism mission and Afghan-led operations against the Taliban.

Operation Inherent Resolve 
In March 2017, Stars and Stripes reported that 400 soldiers from the division's headquarters element will deploy to Iraq in summer 2017, where it led the coalition's ground efforts as part of Operation Inherent Resolve.

Structure 

The division has been reorganized under the new modular design after moving to Fort Bliss, in which the deployable unit of maneuver is a brigade rather than a division. It consists of a division headquarters battalion, three armored brigade combat teams, a combat aviation brigade, a sustainment brigade, and a division artillery, field artillery battalions are assigned to their respective brigade combat teams.

The division's 3rd Infantry Brigade Combat Team was deactivated after leaving Afghanistan in spring 2015, and its maneuver battalions were reassigned to the remaining three brigade combat teams; subsequently the division's 4th Armored Brigade Combat Team was re-flagged as 3rd Armored Brigade Combat Team.

1st Armored Division consists of the following elements:
  Division Headquarters and Headquarters Battalion "Gladiator"
 Headquarters and Support Company
 Operations Company
 Intelligence and Sustainment Company
 Division Signal Company
 1st Armored Division Band
 1st Armored Brigade Combat Team (ABCT) "Ready First" 
 Headquarters and Headquarters Company (HHC)
  6th Squadron, 1st Cavalry Regiment
  2nd Battalion, 37th Armor Regiment
  4th Battalion, 70th Armor Regiment
  1st Battalion, 36th Infantry Regiment
  2nd Battalion, 3rd Field Artillery Regiment (FAR)
  16th Brigade Engineer Battalion (BEB)
  501st Brigade Support Battalion (BSB)
 2nd ABCT "Iron Brigade"
 HHC
  1st Squadron, 1st Cavalry Regiment
  1st Battalion, 35th Armor Regiment
  1st Battalion, 37th Armor Regiment
  1st Battalion, 6th Infantry Regiment
  4th Battalion, 27th FAR
  40th Brigade Engineer Battalion
  47th Brigade Support Battalion
 3rd ABCT "Bulldog Brigade"
 HHC
  2nd Squadron, 13th Cavalry Regiment
  1st Battalion, 67th Armor Regiment
  1st Battalion, 77th Armor Regiment
  4th Battalion, 6th Infantry Regiment
  4th Battalion, 1st FAR
  2nd Brigade Engineer Battalion
  123rd Brigade Support Battalion
 1st Armored Division Artillery (DIVARTY) "Iron Steel" (formerly 212th Fires Brigade)
 Headquarters and Headquarters Battery
 24th Theater Public Affairs Support Element (TPASE)

 Combat Aviation Brigade, 1st Armored Division "Iron Eagle"
  HHC
  3rd Squadron (Heavy Attack-Reconnaissance), 6th Cavalry Regiment "Heavy Cavalry"
  1st Battalion (Attack), 501st Aviation Regiment "Iron Dragons"
  2nd Battalion (General Support), 501st Aviation Regiment "Desert Knights"
  3rd Battalion (Assault), 501st Aviation Regiment "Apocalypse"
  127th Aviation Support Battalion "Work Horse"
 1st Armored Division Sustainment Brigade "Muleskinner"
  HHC
  Special Troops Battalion "Iron Legion"
  142nd Combat Sustainment Support Battalion "Atlas"

Commanders 

MG Bruce Magruder (July 1940 – March 1942)
MG Orlando Ward (March 1942 – April 1943)
MG Ernest N. Harmon (April 1943 – July 1944)
MG Vernon Prichard (July 1944 – September 1945)
MG Roderick R. Allen (September 1945 – January 1946)
MG Hobart R. Gay (February to April 1946)
Division inactivated 1946-1951
MG Bruce C. Clarke (March 1951 – April 1953)
MG Leander L. Doan (April to July 1953)
BG Edward G. Farrand (acting) (July to October 1953)
MG William S. Biddle (October 1953 – July 1955)
MG Robert Lee Howze Jr. (July 1955 – February 1957)
MG Edward G. Farrand (March to December 1957)
BG Delk M. Oden	(December 1957 – May 1959)
BG Franklin F. Wing (May 1959 – August 1960)
BG Roland H. Del Mar (August 1960 – May 1961)
BG Roy Lassetter Jr. (May 1961 – February 1962)
MG Ralph E. Haines Jr. (February 1962 – May 1963)
MG Harvey J. Jablonsky (May 1963 – May 1965)
MG George Ruhlen (June 1965 – July 1967)
MG Richard G. Stilwell (August 1967 – April 1968)
MG John K. Boles (April 1968 – February 1970)
MG William R. Desobry (February 1970 – March 1971)
MG James C. Smith (March to May 1971)
MG James V. Galloway (May 1971 – August 1972)
MG Adrian St. John Jr. (August 1972 – March 1974)
MG Rolland V. Heiser (March 1974 – August 1975)
MG William L. Webb Jr. (August 1975 – January 1978)
MG Glenn K. Otis (January 1978 – August 1979)
MG John C. Faith (September 1979 – November 1981)
MG Thomas F. Healy (November 1981 – October 1983)
MG Crosbie E. Saint (October 1983 – June 1985)
MG Dave R. Palmer (June 1985 – July 1986)
MG Edwin S. Leland Jr. (July 1986 – July 1988)
MG Frederick M. Franks Jr. (July 1988 – August 1989)
MG Ronald H. Griffith (August 1989 – May 1991)
MG William M. Boice (May 1991 – July 1993)
MG William G. Carter II (July 1993 – January 1995)
MG William L. Nash (January 1995 – May 1997)
MG Larry R. Ellis (May 1997 – July 1999)
MG George W. Casey Jr. (July 1999 – July 2001)
MG Ricardo S. Sánchez (July 2001 – July 2003)
MG Martin E. Dempsey (July 2003 – July 2005)
MG Fred D. Robinson Jr. (July 2005 – May 2007)
MG Mark Hertling (May 2007 – May 2009)
MG Terry A. Wolff (May 2009 – May 2011)
MG Dana J.H. Pittard (May 2011 – May 2013)
MG Sean MacFarland (May 2013 – August 2014)
MG Stephen Twitty (August 2014	– June 2016)
MG Robert P. White (June 2016 – July 2018)
MG Patrick E. Matlock (July 2018 – July 2020)
BG Matthew L. Eichburg (acting) (July to September 2020)
MG Sean C. Bernabe (September 2020 – July 2022)
MG James P. Isenhower III (July 2022 – present)

Current 
Major General Sean C. Bernabe assumed command of the 1st Armored Division on 30 September 2020. Deputy commander Brigadier General Matthew L. Eichburg had been serving as the interim commanding officer since 28 July 2020.

The division command group consists of:
Commanding General: Major General James P. Isenhower III
Deputy Commanding Officer (Operations): Brigadier General Michael J. Simmering
Deputy Commanding General (Maneuver): Brigadier Richard "Dinger" Bell
Deputy Commanding Officer (Support): Colonel Alric L. Francis
Chief of Staff: Colonel Scott P. Knight Jr.
Command Sergeant Major: Command Sergeant Major Michael C. Williams

Order of battle

1940 
The first order of battle for the 1st Armored Division was:

HHC, 1st Armored Division
 HHC, 1st Armored Brigade
1st Armored Regiment (Light)
13th Armored Regiment (Light)
69th Armored Regiment (Medium)
81st Armored Reconnaissance Squadron
6th Armored Infantry Regiment
68th Armored Field Artillery Regiment
27th Field Artillery Battalion (Armored)
16th Engineer Battalion (Armored)
13th Quartermaster Battalion (Armored)
19th Ordnance Battalion (Armored)
47th Medical Battalion (Armored)
141st Signal Company (Armored)

On 15 April 1941 the division sent a cadre to form the 4th Armored Division at Pine Camp, New York.

1944 
In July 1944, the division was reorganized as a "light" armored division. All other armored divisions, with exception of 2nd Armored and 3rd Armored, had been reorganized on 15 September 1943; at that time, 1st Armored was actively engaged in fighting in the Italian Campaign. Its new composition was:

 Headquarters Company
 Combat Command A
 Combat Command B
 Reserve Command
 1st Tank Battalion
 4th Tank Battalion
 13th Tank Battalion
 6th Armored Infantry Battalion
 11th Armored Infantry Battalion
 14th Armored Infantry Battalion
 81st Cavalry Reconnaissance Squadron (Mechanized)
 16th Armored Engineer Battalion
 141st Armored Signal Company
 1st Armored Division Artillery
 27th Armored Field Artillery Battalion
 68th Armored Field Artillery Battalion
 91st Armored Field Artillery Battalion
 1st Armored Division Trains
 123rd Armored Ordnance Maintenance Battalion
 47th Armored Medical Battalion
 Military Police Platoon
 Band

Honors

HHC, 1st Armored Division
Campaign participation credit
 World War II
 Gulf War
 Global War on Terrorism
 Iraq War
Decorations
Meritorious Unit Commendation (Army) for SOUTHWEST ASIA
Army Superior Unit Award for TF Eagle from 10 April 1994 to 7 November 1996
Valorous Unit Award For Operation Iraqi Freedom I
Presidential Unit Citation For Operation Iraqi Freedom I
Joint Meritorious Unit Award For Operation Iraqi Freedom I
Meritorious Unit Commendation (Army) for Operation IRAQI FREEDOM 07–09
Meritorious Unit Commendation (Army) for Operation IRAQI FREEDOM 10–11/ Operation NEW DAWN

HHC, 1st Brigade, 1st Armored Division
Campaign participation credit
World War II:
Tunisia;
Naples-Foggia;
Anzio;
Rome-Arno;
North Apennines;
Po Valley
Decorations
Army Superior Unit Award for TF Eagle from 10 April 1994 to 7 November 1996
Presidential Unit Citation for Operation Iraqi Freedom
Joint Meritorious Unit Award for Operation Iraqi Freedom
Valorous Unit Citation for Operation Iraqi Freedom
Navy Unit Commendation for Operation Iraqi Freedom

HHC, 2nd Brigade, 1st Armored Division
Campaign participation credit
World War II:
Algeria-French Morocco (with arrowhead);
Tunisia;
Naples-Foggia;
Anzio;
 Rome-Arno;
North Apennines;
Po Valley
Southwest Asia:
Defense of Saudi Arabia;
 Liberation and Defense of Kuwait;
 Cease-Fire

Decorations
Presidential Unit Citation for OIF 1 (2003–2004)
Valorous Unit Award, IRAQ 1991
Meritorious Unit Commendation, SOUTHWEST ASIA 2005–2006
Meritorious Unit Commendation, IRAQ 2008–2009
Army Superior Unit Award for 1995–1996

HHC, 3rd Brigade, 1st Armored Division

Campaign participation credit
World War II:
Rome-Arno;
North Apennines;
Po Valley
Southwest Asia:
Defense of Saudi Arabia;
Liberation and Defense of Kuwait;
Cease-Fire

Decorations
Valorous Unit Award for IRAQ-KUWAIT
Valorous Unit Award for Operation Iraqi Freedom (OIF 1)

HHB, 1st Armored Division Artillery
Campaign participation credit
World War II:
Tunisia;
Naples-Foggia;
Rome-Arno;
Anzio;
North Apennines;
Po Valley
Southwest Asia:
Defense of Saudi Arabia;
Liberation and Defense of Kuwait
Decorations
Meritorious Unit Commendation (Army) for SOUTHWEST ASIA

HHC, 1st Armored Division Support Command
Campaign participation credit
World War II:
Tunisia;
Naples-Foggia;
Rome-Arno;
North Apennines;
Po Valley
Southwest Asia:
Defense of Saudi Arabia;
Liberation and Defense of Kuwait;
Cease-Fire
Decorations
Meritorious Unit Commendation (Army) for SOUTHWEST ASIA

HHC, Aviation Brigade, 1st Armored Division
Campaign participation credit;
Southwest Asia:
Defense of Saudi Arabia;
Liberation and Defense of Kuwait;
Cease-Fire
Decorations;
Valorous Unit Award for IRAQ-KUWAIT
Army Superior Unit Award for 1995–1996

Notes

References

Additional reading
 
  Covers its first (World War II era) incarnation.

External links

 1st Armored Division Official Twitter
 
 Threads and Treads; 1st Armored Division Insignia turns 80, Army.mil, July 13, 2020

Armored divisions of the United States Army
United States Army divisions during World War II
Military units and formations established in 1940
Military units and formations of the United States in the Gulf War
Military units and formations of the Iraq War